The  Sistema Especial de Liquidação e Custodia (SELIC) (Special System for Settlement and Custody) is the Brazilian Central Bank's system for performing open market operations in execution of monetary policy. The SELIC rate is the Bank's overnight rate.

References

Banking in Brazil
Monetary policy